Danny Lee "Nitro" Clark (born May 21, 1964) is an American athlete, television personality, author, actor, and producer. He is best known for his role as gladiator Nitro on the TV show American Gladiators. He is also a health and fitness expert and the creator of the "Gladiator Rock'n Run".

Biography
Clark began his career as an athlete, playing football for San Jose State University where he was a standout defensive lineman. Clark was also a member of Sigma Alpha Epsilon fraternity. He then went on to play briefly for the Los Angeles Rams of the NFL, and in the Professional European League.

Clark, a health and fitness expert, is best known from the game show American Gladiators, having worked on both the original version and the revival;  from 1989–92, and again in 1994–95, he was the gladiator Nitro; during the original show's final season, he was the analyst and co-host for the show.  In the 2008 revival, he is the coordinating producer for the show.  The original series aired in over 40 countries, with reruns on USA Network, TNT, Spike, ESPN Classic, and airs currently on Charge!.  The revival aired on NBC.

When American Gladiators returned to the U.S. airwaves on ESPN Classic on April 1, 2007, the network aired a marathon of episodes. Clark was the on-air host for that marathon, telling behind-the-scenes stories and trivia about the series in between the episodes. Clark also conducted an ESPN chat session related with the show and was one of the producers of the revamped "American Gladiator" on NBC that debuted to over 40 million viewers in 2010 making it one of the highest rated debuts of the season.

After American Gladiators, Clark turned to acting, appearing in such motion pictures as Death Becomes Her, with Meryl Streep, Bruce Willis, and Goldie Hawn; and Equilibrium, with Christian Bale. He has also guest starred in TV series including Ellen, Walker, Texas Ranger, California Dreams, V.I.P., Married... with Children, Who's the Boss?, Saved by the Bell, and The Brothers García.

Clark was the writer/director/producer of the independent film Looking for Bruce. He has also written several screenplays for various studios, producers, and production companies, including a bio-pic Battle of Harlem, about the first African American police officer in the NYPD.

Dan wrote his memoir Gladiator: A True Story of 'Roids, Rage, and Redemption for Simon and Schuster. Published in February 2009.

Clark has appeared on a variety of talk shows including: The Tonight Show, Good Morning America, CBS Morning News, Today, "The Ticket", and Live with Regis and Kathy Lee. He has also appeared on the cover of TV Guide and numerous other magazines.

Clark enjoys all sports, yoga, acting, writing and martial arts (he has a black belt in Tae Kwon Do) and is often called on to perform his own stunts. Since 2002 he has also been a mentor in the Young Story Tellers program which is dedicated to increasing literacy among inner city youths. Clark makes his home in the Hollywood Hills and can often be found walking his Labrador Retriever, Ella, at nearby Runyon Canyon Park.

Dan is the creator of the "Gladiator Rock'n Run,"  an obstacle adventure run in America that challenges participants to test their skills over a 5k to 10k course.  It is publicized as the "Most Insane Day of your Life."  Proceeds benefit Talk About Curing Autism and has raised hundreds of thousand of dollars for the cause.

Clark was a contestant featured in the bull riding reality show, Ty Murray's Celebrity Bull Riding Challenge, which premiered in August 2007 on CMT.

Dan is also the founder of "Ten Thousand Pounds", a program that tackles the epidemic of childhood obesity through education, motivating, and empowering Americas Youth.

In 2017 Dan released his book "F Dying" about his journey after his 2013 heart attack.

Filmography
 Twin Sitters (1994)

References

External links

American Gladiators Nitro Profile (GladiatorsTV.com)
Photo of Nitro
Dan Clark's NFL player page
Stats

1964 births
American football linebackers
American male television actors
American male voice actors
Living people
Los Angeles Rams players
Participants in American reality television series
People from Zama, Kanagawa
Sportspeople from Kanagawa Prefecture
San Jose State Spartans football players
Japanese emigrants to the United States
American entertainers